The 1960 Society of Film and Television Arts Television Awards is the United Kingdom's premier television awards ceremony. The awards later became known as the British Academy Television Awards, under which name they are still given.

Winners
Actor
Patrick McGoohan
Actress
Catherine Lacey
Designer
Clifford Hatts
Drama Production
William Kotcheff
Factual
Denis Mitchell
Light Entertainment (Artist)
Tony Hancock
Light Entertainment (Production)
Bill Ward
Personality
John Freeman
Scriptwriting
Galton and Simpson
Special Award
John Elliot
Writers Award
Galton and Simpson

References

External links
http://awards.bafta.org/1960.

1960
Society of Film and Television Arts Television Awards
Society of Film and Television Arts Television Awards
Society of Film and Television Arts Television Awards